Anthony De La Torre (born November 24, 1993) is an American actor, singer, songwriter and guitarist, known for his roles as young Jack Sparrow in Pirates of the Caribbean: Dead Men Tell No Tales (2017) and Jan Axel Blomberg in Lords of Chaos (2018).

Early life
De La Torre was born in Bowling Green, Ohio, to Cuban parents. His mother, Esther Garcia, is a Spanish teacher at Bowling Green High School, and also owns a cleaning business. His parents divorced shortly after De La Torre's birth. He has one older brother, Nicolas, and one older sister, Angelica. De La Torre attended St. Aloysius Elementary and Junior High School in Bowling Green, before enrolling in online schooling via Ohio Virtual Academy.

As a teen, De La Torre performed as a Justin Bieber impersonator, for which he would make between $300 and $600 an hour, and also worked for his mother's cleaning business. In 2012, he moved to Nashville, Tennessee, to work on a music project with songwriter and producer Desmond Child. The following year, he moved to Los Angeles, California.

Career
De La Torre began his acting career with a voice role in Go, Diego, Go! as Willie the Whistling Duck, for which he was credited as Antonio Cabrera. He also appeared in a print advertisement for Del Monte ketchup. He had a recurring role in two episodes of Nickelodeon's 100 Things to Do Before High School, portraying a Latino actor named Anthony Del Rey.

De La Torre starred as the young Jack Sparrow in the 2017 blockbuster fantasy film Pirates of the Caribbean: Dead Men Tell No Tales, directed by Joachim Rønning and Espen Sandberg. His appearance as the character was merged with Johnny Depp's via CGI. In July 2017, he replaced Toby Rand as the frontman for The Fell, a rock band consisting of Mike Krompass, Randy Cooke, and Billy Sheehan.

He portrayed Jan Axel Blomberg / Hellhammer in Jonas Åkerlund's thriller Lords of Chaos, alongside Rory Culkin, Emory Cohen and Jack Kilmer. De La Torre also appeared as Hellhammer in the music video for Metallica's "ManUNkind". The film premiered at the 2018 Sundance Film Festival. De La Torre is set to star in the title role in the low budget horror film Johnny Gruesome, directed by Greg Lamberson.

Personal life
Since August 2015, De La Torre has been in a relationship with Lana Condor. They became engaged on January 28, 2022.

Filmography

Film

Television

References

External links
 

1993 births
21st-century American male actors
21st-century American singers
21st-century American guitarists
American male film actors
American male television actors
American people of Cuban descent
American rock guitarists
American rock songwriters
Guitarists from Ohio
Living people
Male actors from Ohio
Singers from Ohio
Songwriters from Ohio